Memorial Park station is a below-grade light rail station on the L Line of the Los Angeles Metro Rail system. It is located at Holly Street and at the end of Arroyo Parkway in Pasadena, California. The station is named after the nearby Memorial Park and is situated on the northern edge of Old Town Pasadena.

Memorial Park station was built in a trench beneath the Holly Street Village Apartments, which was constructed with the trench in 1994 in anticipation of a light rail station at this site. This station features station art called The First Artists in Southern California: A Short Story, created by artist John Valadez.

Memorial Park station opened on July 26, 2003, as part of the original Gold Line, then known as the "Pasadena Metro Blue Line" project. This station and all the other original and Foothill Extension stations will be part of the A Line upon completion of the Regional Connector project in 2023.

It is one of the L Line stations near the Rose Parade route on Colorado Boulevard and is heavily used by people coming to see the parade. The station is also located near the Rose Bowl Shuttle which stops at the Parsons Corporation headquarters building and offers service to most events at the stadium. During the 2028 Summer Olympics, the station will serve spectators traveling to and from the Rose Bowl.

Service

Station layout

Hours and frequency

Connections 
, the following connections are available:
 Foothill Transit: , Rose Bowl Shuttle 
 LADOT Commuter Express: 
 Pasadena Transit: 20, 40, 51, 52
 ArtCenter College of Design Shuttle

Future 
This station will connect with North Hollywood–Pasadena Transit Line, a bus rapid transit line in the Metro Busway network in Los Angeles, California which will connect Pasadena and the North Hollywood Metro Station.

Notable places nearby 
The station is within walking distance of the following notable places:
 Armory Center for the Arts
 Fuller Theological Seminary
 Gamble House
 Memorial Park & Levitt Pavilion
 Norton Simon Museum
 Old Pasadena
 USC Pacific Asia Museum
 Pasadena City Hall
 Pasadena Civic Center District
 Pasadena Museum of History
 The Paseo

References 

L Line (Los Angeles Metro) stations
Transportation in Pasadena, California
Railway stations in the United States opened in 2003